Salerno Cathedral (or duomo) is the main church in the city of Salerno in southern Italy and a major tourist attraction. It is dedicated to Saint Matthew, whose relics are inside the crypt.

The Cathedral was built when the city was the capital of the Principality of Salerno.

History

Begun by Robert Guiscard in 1076 in the episcopate of Alfano I, the Duomo was consecrated by Pope Gregory VII in 1084.

In 1688, the architect Ferdinando Sanfelice remodelled the interior of the Duomo in the Neapolitan Baroque and Rococo styles. A restoration in the 1930s brought it back to an appearance similar to the original one.

The Duomo is a symbol of the Italian Renaissance because inside is the tomb of Pope Gregory VII who rejected imperial domination of the church.

The Duomo was damaged in World War II when, as part of the Operation Avalanche, the Allies landed in Salerno in September 1943.

Architectural features

The most striking external feature is the  bell tower (mid-12th century), with small arcades and mullioned windows, standing 56 m high and in Arabic-Norman style. It contains 8 large bells. The façade has a Romanesque portal with Byzantine-style bronze doors from Constantinople (1099), with 56 panels with figures, crosses and stories from Jesus's life. The entrance has a portico with 28 antique columns whose pointed arches, with lava rock intarsia, show influence of Arab art, and contains a series of ancient Roman sarcophagi.

The interior has a nave and two aisles, divided by pilasters in which the original columns are embedded, and three apses. Artworks include two pulpits with mosaic decorations, paintings by Francesco Solimena, a 14th-century Gothic statue of Madonna with Child and the sepulchres of the Neapolitan queen Margaret of Durazzo, of Roger Borsa and of archbishop Bartolomeo d'Arpano, and the tomb of Pope Gregory VII.

The crypt, believed to house the remains of Matthew the Apostle, is a groin vaulted hall with a basilica-like plan divided by columns. It was restored under design by Domenico Fontana and his son Giulio in 1606–1608, with marble decorations added in the 18th century. All of the ceiling frescoes are painted by Belisario Corenzio and depict scenes from the Gospel of Matthew, as well as some episodes of the history of Salerno (such as the siege of the city by the French).

The Duomo Museum houses artworks from different ages, including the silver statues of the Salernitane Martyrs (13th century) and documents of the renowned Schola Medica Salernitana (the first University of Europe, according to some scholars like G. Crisci).

See also
 Principality of Salerno
 Salerno

Sources

External links

Photo of the Cripta of the Salerno Cathedral
 Official website 
Link to an Italian page about the Cathedral

 
Cathedral
Cathedrals in Campania
Salerno
11th-century Roman Catholic church buildings in Italy
1084 establishments in Europe
11th-century establishments in Italy
Churches completed in 1084
Burial places of popes
Culture in Salerno
Sites of papal elections
Romanesque architecture in Campania
Tombs of apostles
Burial sites of the Capetian House of Anjou